HBO Hits is a multiplex channel of HBO in Asia featuring Hollywood blockbuster movies of all genres.

Programming
HBO Hits Asia has licensing deals with two major Hollywood conglomerates film studios: Warner Bros. Discovery (Warner Bros. Pictures; New Line Cinema, HBO Films, Castle Rock Entertainment; Warner Independent Pictures, Franchise Pictures) and Paramount Global (Paramount Pictures, Paramount Vantage).

See also
 HBO 2

References

External links
 Official website

Hits
HBO Hits
HBO Hits
Movie channels in Singapore
Movie channels in the Philippines
Television channels and stations established in 2006